Maud Hospital was a small hospital providing psychogeriatric services in Maud, Aberdeenshire. It was managed by NHS Grampian.

History
The hospital was designed by Alexander Ellis and opened as the Buchan Combination Poorhouse and Maud Home in 1867. It joined the National Health Service in 1948 but after the introduction of Care in the Community in the early 1980s, it went into a period of decline and, following a consultation by Aberdeenshire Community Health Partnership in 2005, it closed in October 2008.

References

External links
 Buchan Combination, Aberdeenshire

NHS Grampian
Hospitals in Aberdeenshire
Former psychiatric hospitals in Scotland
Defunct hospitals in Scotland
Maud, Aberdeenshire